is a Japanese professional baseball pitcher for the Hanshin Tigers in Japan's Nippon Professional Baseball.

Early Baseball Career
Junya started playing little league baseball in second grade for the Suzugamine Reds, and continued to play for the Young Hiroshima team of Ajinadai Junior High. He was selected to play for the national team Nomo Japan in his 3rd year.

He attended Soshi Gakuen High in the neighboring prefecture of Okayama, and joined their baseball team as a pitcher. While he did not get any play time as a freshman, he led his team as the ace and clean up hitter in his 2nd year to participate in the 2018 Summer Koshien Tournament where he gained nationwide recognition. On top of notching 2 hits during the 1st round against Sohseikan High, he singlehandedly pitched a shutout win, giving away only 4 hits and striking out 16 with at least one batter KO-ed per inning. This was the first time since 1948 that a 2nd year pitcher achieved this feat of a shutout win with 16 KOs, no walks or hit by pitch during the Summer Koshien tournament. They got eliminated in the 2nd round however, when a consecutive walk and hit by pitch cost them 3 runs in the 9th inning against Shimonoseki High.  He finished the tournament with a 2.0 ERA, 7 surrendered hits and 25 KOs in 18 innings.

Despite his school not making it to any national tournaments in his senior year, he was chosen to play for the Samurai Japan team in the U-18 Baseball World Cup. Among the pitchers in the tournament, he had the most appearances (4 games, 13.3 innings) and finished with a 1.35 ERA. He was also awarded the tournament's home run title for batting in 2 home runs, which he notched as a designated hitter in the game against South Africa where he drove in a total of 8 runs. He finished high school with 25 home runs to his name and was one of the top prospects of the 2019 draft for his two-way potential.

Hanshin Tigers

He was the 1st round pick of the Hanshin Tigers in 2019 Nippon Professional Baseball draft (2nd alternative choice after they lost the lottery for Yasunobu Okugawa). He inked a 100 million yen contract and a 30 million signing bonus with the Tigers for a 12 million yen annual salary, and was assigned the jersey number 15.

Playing Style
A 6-foot tall right handed pitcher with an overhand delivery, he pitches a four-seam fastball in the  range as his main pitch (maxed at ), coupled with a slider and a forkball. Also included in his arsenal are a curveball, changeup and a splitter.

Personal life

He is a third cousin of Yuki Nishi, the former ace of the Orix Buffaloes who now pitches for the Tigers. Their grandfathers were brothers but he and Yuki have never met in person until they joined the Tigers.

As a kid, he was a fan of the Hiroshima Carps and looked up to their ace pitcher Kenta Maeda who now plays in the majors.

When Junya was a freshman, his father collapsed on the way home from watching one of his son's matches and ultimately lead to his untimely death. That's why when his team reached the nationals on the following year, he decided to dedicate his matches to his father and he would sometimes do a celebratory fist pump on the mound with his chest facing the heavens after taking out a batter. As he did this several times in his games, this caught the attention of the tournament runners and issued him a warning for what was construed as a showy display. The umpire also issued him the same warning on the 2nd round of the tournament, and despite that day being his late father's birthday, Junya suppressed the urge to fist pump and subsequently lost the match.

References

External links
 Nippon Professional Baseball Stats

2001 births
Living people
Baseball people from Hiroshima Prefecture
Nippon Professional Baseball pitchers
Japanese baseball players
Hanshin Tigers players